Viaccess is a conditional access system edit by Orange S.A. There are six versions in use today, Viaccess PC2.3, Viaccess PC2.4, Viaccess PC2.5, Viaccess PC2.6, Viaccess ACS3.x/Prime Sentinel, Viaccess ACS4.1,  Viaccess ACS5.0, and Viaccess ACS6.x/Adaptive Sentinel.

Viaccess was developed as the digital version of the EuroCrypt system used with the hybrid MAC system,

The first version is sometimes referred to as Viaccess 1, and the latter three, although different, as Viaccess 2. PC2.3 and PC2.4 are known to be ineffective, and many set-top boxes can be 'patched' to decrypt Viaccess signals without payment, however PC2.5 and PC2.6 are secure, with PC2.5 remaining secure two years after its first commercial deployment. PC2.6 was introduced at the end of 2005. PC3.0 was introduced during mid-2007.

There are two modifications of Viaccess PC2.3 in use. The first, known as TPS Crypt, is used by TPS. Despite being compromised also, the TPS Crypt system has been further modified to use Advanced Encryption System (AES) keys. These AES keys were originally updated once weekly, however after this inconvenienced unauthorised viewers little, a second TPS crypt system was introduced, by which keys are changed every 12 minutes, with keys being sent over TPS's internal Open TV system. This therefore meant that only TPS receivers could receive the new AES key, and not the insecure TPS subscription cards. Monitoring and analysing of the keys by hacking groups, however, has brought about key lists, where the AES keys have been successfully predicted. Implementation of this procedure of automatically updating keys has proved difficult, if not impossible, to implement on many satellite receivers, rendering the TPS Crypt AES system a general success.

In 2008, Viaccess acquired Orca interactive and in 2012 they merge under the name Viaccess-Orca.
      
The second Viaccess modification, called ThalesCrypt, is used by Canal Satellite France to protect its contents on the transport network to the head-ends of the cable networks; it is an over-encryption mechanism of the original protocol encryption keys.

Viaccess is currently used by a large number of providers. These include:
 Team:Media Bosnia Some programs
 ART
 NTV
 Televisa Networks
 Canal Satellite France
 FRANSAT
 AB Sat
 ETTV
 TBLTV
 Home2US
 Orange TV Romania
 Orange Polska
 YouSee
 Croatian Radiotelevision
 RTV Slovenija
 Skylink Czechia/Slovakia
 SRG SSR idée suisse
 Cyfrowy Polsat
 Platforma Canal+

Viaccess is the 3rd largest conditional access system provider in the world (in 2004).

Viaccess is also a subsidiary of Orange S.A. which offers pay TV and DRM enabled software.

Orca Interactive is a subsidiary of Viaccess which offers IPTV Middleware since 2008.

References

External links
Viaccess home page

Digital television
Conditional-access television broadcasting